Ceremony for the 12th Hundred Flowers Awards was held in 1989, Beijing.

Awards

Best Film

Best Actor

Best Actress

Best Supporting Actor

Best Supporting Actress

External links
China.com.cn
Winners List

1989